The Washington State Association for Justice is a trade association of over 2,200 plaintiff's attorneys and staff, with offices in Seattle, Olympia and Spokane.
 
WSAJ provides members with professional networking, online listserves, a data bank of relevant court documents and legal experts, and a member directory. The organization also provides an extensive continuing legal education (CLE) program in locations throughout Washington. Additionally, WSAJ's Olympia-based government affairs staff lobbies legislators and state agencies to advance a pro-civil justice legislative agenda, intended to preserve and enhance the rights of injured people.

History 

The Washington State Association for Justice was originally formed in 1953 as the National Association of Claimants Compensation Attorneys - NACCA; it became the Washington State Trial Lawyers Association (WSTLA) in 1967 and the Washington State Association for Justice (WSAJ) in 2008. WSAJ current statewide membership comprises over 2,400 attorneys and staff.

The Association aims to protect and promote a fair justice system and the right to trial by jury, and to ensure that any person who is harmed by the misconduct or negligence of others can obtain justice in America's courtrooms, even in actions against the most powerful interests.

Mission 
The Washington State Association for Justice stated mission is:
We stand up in the courtroom and the halls of government for real people. We defend your Constitutional rights, including the right to have your day in court. We hold corporate and other powerful interests accountable. We are a community creating and sharing resources for our members to secure justice.

Membership and governance 

The 2022-23 WSAJ President is Nathan P. ("Nate") Roberts, and the President-Elect is Colleen Durkin Peterson.    Sara Crumb is WSAJ's Executive Director, serving as chief executive of the organization since 2020. Larry Shannon is the Government Affairs Director, serving in that role since 1994.

The organization is governed by an approximately 35-member Board of Governors, elected by voting members. Voting members must be lawyers who have represented the plaintiff in at least 50 percent of their cases. WSAJ's attorney members practice a broad range of legal practice areas, including personal injury, wrongful death, medical malpractice, worker's compensation, insurance litigation, consumer protection, employment litigation, nursing home abuse, and product liability.

References

External links 
Washington State Association for Justice 
Washington State Association for Justice Facebook Page
American Association for Justice

1953 establishments in Washington (state)
Law-related professional associations
Organizations established in 1953